İzmirspor is an underground station on the Fahrettin Altay—Evka 3 Line of the İzmir Metro in Hatay, Konak. Located under İnönü Avenue, it consists of two side platforms servicing two tracks. Connection to ESHOT bus service is available at street level.

İzmirspor opened on 29 December 2012, along with Hatay station, as part of a two station westward extension of the line. The opening marked the partial completion of the long-awaited extension to Fahrettin Altay, which was opened fully on 27 July 2014.

Connections
ESHOT operates city bus service on İnönü Avenue.

References

İzmir Metro
Railway stations opened in 2012
2012 establishments in Turkey
Railway stations in İzmir Province